Jacob Astley, 16th Baron Hastings (13 November 1797 – 27 December 1859), known as Sir Jacob Astley, Bt, between 1817 and 1841, was a British peer and Whig politician.

Background and education
Hastings was the eldest son of Sir Jacob Astley, 5th Baronet, and Hester, daughter of Samuel Browne. He was educated at Magdalen College, Oxford. In 1817 he succeeded his father to the baronetcy and to the family seat of Melton Constable Hall in Norfolk.

Political career
Hastings was High Sheriff of Norfolk between 1821 and 1822. In 1832 he was returned to Parliament for Norfolk West, a seat he held until 1837. In 1841 the House of Lords announced that Hastings was one of the co-heirs to the barony of Hastings, a peerage which had been dormant since 1389 and technically abeyant since 1542, as a descendant of Elizabeth, daughter of Hugh Hastings, de jure 14th Baron Hastings. At that time he lived in Melton Constable. Later the same year the abeyance was terminated in his favour and he was issued a writ to the House of Lords.

Family

Lord Hastings, while still a baronet, married Georgiana Carolina, daughter of Sir Henry Dashwood, in 1819. They had two sons. 

In 1835, Georgiana gave birth to a daughter, named Georgiana, fathered by Captain Thomas Garth of the 15th Hussars. She died in June of the same year, aged 39.

Lord Hastings died in December 1859, aged 62, and was succeeded by his eldest son, Jacob.

Ancestry

References

External links 
 

1797 births
1859 deaths
Members of the Parliament of the United Kingdom for English constituencies
UK MPs 1832–1835
UK MPs 1835–1837
Whig (British political party) MPs
High Sheriffs of Norfolk
People from North Norfolk (district)
Barons Hastings